Arthur Francis Deibel (April 3, 1896 – April 23, 1984) was a professional football player who spent a year in the National Football League with the Canton Bulldogs in 1926. Prior to joining the NFL, Deibel played and was the captain of the Millville Football & Athletic Club, a successful independent club from New Jersey that was headed up by Guy Chamberlin. After a highly successful 1925 season, the Big Blue played a series of pick-up games against Red Grange and the Tampa Cardinals in Florida. The Big Blue won the series with a record of 3-0-1.

Deibel played at the college level for Lafayette College. In 1923 he was named captain of school's football team.

References

1896 births
1984 deaths
Players of American football from Ohio
Canton Bulldogs players
Millville Football & Athletic Club players
Lafayette Leopards football players